Christopher Adam Clemons (born July 23, 1997) is an American professional basketball player for the Xinjiang Flying Tigers of the Chinese Basketball Association (CBA). He played college basketball for the Campbell Fighting Camels, and was signed by the Houston Rockets of the NBA as an undrafted rookie.

Early life and high school career
Growing up in Raleigh, North Carolina, Clemons idolized Allen Iverson and sought to incorporate Iverson's crossover dribble into his playing style. Despite standing 5'9, Clemons could dunk in high school at Millbrook. Campbell coach Kevin McGeehan recruited him due to his confidence and 44-inch vertical leap. In a state tournament game as a senior, Clemons broke the school single-game record with 41 points.

College career
Clemons averaged 18.5 points per game as a freshman at Campbell and was named the Big South Freshman of the Year. Shooting 18-of-32 from the field, Clemons scored 51 points in an 81–79 win over UNC Asheville in the Big South Tournament as a sophomore, breaking the tournament scoring record. He became the fourth player to score 50 points that season. Clemons was named to the First Team All-Big South in his sophomore season. As a sophomore, Clemons averaged 25.1 points per game, second highest in Division I behind Marcus Keene, and took 42.2 percent of his team's shots, the highest percentage in college basketball. With 904 points, Clemons set the school record for points in a season.

Clemons had a season-high 42 points against Liberty on January 23, 2018 and alongside Marcus Burk became the first teammates in NCAA history to each hit 10 threes in a game. He passed the 2,000 point mark in his career on February 7, scoring 33 points in a win against Gardner–Webb. On March 14, Clemons passed Jonathan Rodriguez as Campbell's all-time leading scorer, adding 32 points in a win against Miami (Ohio). Clemons repeated on the First Team All-Big South as a junior and received seven first place votes for conference player of the year. As a junior, Clemons averaged 24.9 points per game, fourth highest in the nation. He helped the Camels go 18–16 and play in the College Basketball Invitational. After the season, Clemons declared for the 2018 NBA draft but did not hire an agent, thus preserving his collegiate eligibility. He decided to withdraw from the draft and return to Campbell.

Coming into his senior season, Clemons was named Preseason Big South Player of the Year. On December 21, 2018, Clemons became the all-time leading scorer in Big South history. He passed VMI guard Reggie Williams' 2,556 career point total in a game against Austin Peay. He led NCAA Division 1 in scoring with 30.1 points per game and became the third highest scorer in college basketball history.

Professional career

Houston Rockets (2019–2021)
After going undrafted in the 2019 NBA draft, Clemons joined the Houston Rockets for the 2019 NBA Summer League, and later signed an Exhibit 10 contract with the Rockets. On October 17, the Rockets converted him to a two-way player. Clemons made his NBA debut on November 3, scoring 16 points in a 129–100 loss to the Miami Heat. On November 16, with Russell Westbrook and Eric Gordon sidelined due to injury, Clemons scored a career-high 19 points in a win over the Minnesota Timberwolves. On December 27, the Houston Rockets announced that they had converted the contract with Clemons into standard NBA contract. Clemons recorded 14 points and three rebounds on January 10, 2020, in a 113–92 loss to the Oklahoma City Thunder. Clemons had his jersey retired at Campbell during the NBA All-Star Break.
On December 15, 2020 in a preseason game against the San Antonio Spurs, Clemons tore his Achilles while on defense. On January 21, 2021, he was waived by the Rockets.

Maine Celtics (2021–2022)
On October 16, 2021, Clemons signed with the Boston Celtics, but was waived soon thereafter. On October 23, he signed with the Maine Celtics as an affiliate player. Clemons averaged 16.3 points, 4.9 rebounds, 4.1 assists and 1.1 steals per game.

On December 29, 2021, Clemons signed a 10-day contract with the Atlanta Hawks. However, he did not appear in a game for Atlanta. On January 8, 2022, Clemons was reacquired by the Maine Celtics. On January 22, 2022, Clemons set an NBA G League record for most points in a quarter on perfect shooting from the field with 27 points on 9–9 field goal shooting. Later that season he would win the G League Player of the Week on February 13 and G League Player of the month for March.

Clemons joined the Atlanta Hawks for the 2022 NBA Summer League.

Windy City Bulls (2022)
On September 29, 2022, Clemons' returning player rights were traded by the Celtics to the Windy City Bulls. On October 13, he signed a contract with the Bulls. On November 23, Clemons was bought out by the Bulls.

Career statistics

NBA

Regular season

|-
| style="text-align:left;"| 
| style="text-align:left;"| Houston
| 33 || 0 || 8.8 || .401 || .346 || .909 || .9 || .8 || .2 || .1 || 4.9

Playoffs

|-
| style="text-align:left;"| 2020
| style="text-align:left;"| Houston
| 2 || 0 || 4.0 || .400 || .400 || .500 || 1.0 || .0 || .0 || .0 || 3.5

College

|-
| style="text-align:left;"| 2015–16
| style="text-align:left;"| Campbell
| 30 || 29 || 32.2 || .424 || .374 || .844 || 3.7 || 1.8 || 1.5 || .3 || 18.5
|-
| style="text-align:left;"| 2016–17
| style="text-align:left;"| Campbell
| 36 || 34 || 33.5 || .447 || .354 || .825 || 4.6 || 2.6 || 1.9 || .5 || 25.1
|-
| style="text-align:left;"| 2017–18
| style="text-align:left;"| Campbell
| 31 || 30 || 34.0 || .452 || .371 || .861 || 4.6 || 3.1 || 1.6 || .3 || 24.9
|-
| style="text-align:left;"| 2018–19
| style="text-align:left;"| Campbell
| 33 || 33 || 36.6 || .448 || .357 || .869 || 5.1 || 2.8 || 1.5 || .3 || style="background:#cfecec;"| 30.1*
|- class="sortbottom"
| style="text-align:center;" colspan="2"| Career
| 130 || 126 || 34.1 || .444 || .363 || .852 || 4.5 || 2.6 || 1.6 || .4 || 24.8

See also
List of NCAA Division I men's basketball career scoring leaders
List of NCAA Division I men's basketball career free throw scoring leaders

References

External links
Campbell Fighting Camels bio

1997 births
Living people
All-American college men's basketball players
American men's basketball players
Basketball players from Raleigh, North Carolina
Campbell Fighting Camels basketball players
Houston Rockets players
Maine Celtics players
Point guards
Rio Grande Valley Vipers players
Undrafted National Basketball Association players